Callionima parce, the parce sphinx moth, is a species of moth in the family Sphingidae.It was originally described by Johan Christian Fabricius in 1775.

Distribution 
Is known from Argentina, Venezuela, Suriname, French Guiana, Bolivia, Brazil, Peru to Belize, Guatemala, Nicaragua, Costa Rica, Panama and Mexico to southern Florida, southern Texas, southern Arizona and southern California.

Description 
The wingspan is 67–80 mm. The forewing apex is acutely pointed and slightly falcate (sickle shaped). The forewing upperside has a curved pale oblique apical line, expanding into a pale patch that curves back up the outer edge of the apical line towards the apex, resulting in the area between the outer margin and the apical line being paler than the area immediately basal to the apical line. Examination of genitalia is required to distinguish Callionima parce from Callionima falcifera.

Biology 
Adults are on wing year round in Costa Rica. In the United States adults are on wing from April to September in Florida, Texas, Arizona and southern California.

The larvae feed on Stemmadenia obovata and probably other Apocynaceae species.

References

Parce
Moths of North America
Sphingidae of South America
Insects of Mexico
Fauna of the California chaparral and woodlands
Moths described in 1775
Moths of South America
Taxa named by Johan Christian Fabricius